Lysiphyllum hookeri is a species of small tree endemic to Queensland, Australia, of the legume plant family Fabaceae. These trees are known by a variety of common names, including pegunny,  alibangbang, Hooker's bauhinia, white bauhinia, mountain ebony and Queensland ebony.

Taxonomy
It, along with the rest of the genus Lysiphyllum was formerly treated as part of the genus Bauhinia. However, recent molecular phylogenetic analysis confirms that Lysiphyllum is a distinct genus from Bauhinia.

Range and habitat
These trees grow naturally in monsoon forest, littoral rainforest and occasionally in more open forest types in north-eastern Australia. It has also been widely cultivated throughout Australia and the pacific region as a drought-tolerant ornamental plant.

Description
As with most members of the genus, this species produces compound leaves with only a single pair of leaflets, producing a bi-lobed leaf that resembles the wings of a butterfly. Showy white flowers are produced throughout the year dependent on rainfall, and are accented by long red stamens. They also have a lovely delicate scent. The flowers are followed by flat pods containing multiple seeds.

References

Cercidoideae
Flora of Queensland
Drought-tolerant trees
Taxa named by Ferdinand von Mueller